Nikolai Ivanovich Noskov is a Russian singer and former vocalist of the hard rock band Gorky Park (between 1987–1990). Five-time winner of the Golden Gramophone. He was also a member of Москва (Moscow) ensemble in the early 1980s, in band Гран-при (Grand Prix) in 1988, just before joining Gorky Park, and much later in the 1990s in band Николай (Nikolai). Starting 1998, Noskov had a solo career releasing six solo albums. In 2015, he was jury in second season of reality TV series Glavnaya Stsena.

Early years
Born on January 12, 1956, in Gzhatsk, now renamed Gagarin, Nikolai Noskov comes from a "simple working" family, to invoke an old Soviet cliché. His father Ivan worked at a meat-processing factory, and his mother Yekaterina tried herself in the capacities of milkmaid and construction site worker. Kolya’s boyhood gave him his first musical impressions that were mostly folk music, played on traditional Russian instruments or sung by his mother at times. At the age of eight Kolya and his family moved to a bigger city – Cherepovets, Vologda Oblast. There Nikolai finished school and afterwards served his term for the army.

Curious to explore, Kolya tried to play bayan, but as he was growing up, his attention shifted more and more firmly to singing; first in the school choir, then as a solo performer, winning one of his first awards at a local singing contest at the age of fourteen. The lead singer of the school band, he performed the hits of the Beatles, Creedence Clearwater Revival and other western rock bands, bending to the wave of rock’n’roll music, then surgent amid the Soviet youth. Posters depicting the members of Led Zeppelin and Pink Floyd came to relieve Shalyapin’s portrait hung over Nikolai’s bed. His English was then undeveloped, and Nikolai simply transcribed what he heard on the original recording, transcribed it in Cyrillic letters. But later on the circumstances of his life invited him to pay more attention to the language of rock’n’roll.

A self-taught instrumentalist, Noskov plays the guitar, the piano, and the drums at a general versatility level. He even played the trumpet while in the army. Noskov never got an official vocal education for a curious twist of fate, although he applied at the Gnesinykh state musical college. His knowledge of musical notation is also self-learned.

At one of the turning points in his life invited to Moscow by an entrepreneur for audition, Noskov participated in several Moscow-based musical bands, then routinely dubbed "VIA" (Vocal-Instrumental Ensemble), but none of those early engagements held him for long. Rovesniki (Peers) and Nadezhda (Hope) were soon left behind.

Collaboration with Tukhmanov and work in Gorky Park
In 1980 Noskov met a composer then considered by many to be one of the most progressive in Soviet Union. David Tukhmanov decided to create a real hard-rock band with Noskov as lead singer. However, Moskva (Moscow) did not last long. After a few live performances and a recorded album called NLO (UFO) the band was suppressed and crushed by the authorities and the press. The sound of the band proved too hard for the Soviet listeners of the time. Importantly though, Noskov had acquired his first experience of the real studio work, with meticulous Tukhmanov at the reins.
In 1987 Nikolai sang a few songs for musical film Island of Lost Ships.
After some eight years of searching and trying and singing at Moscow restaurants and clubs, one of the most significant breakthroughs occurred in Nikolai Noskov's life: Park Gorkogo, or, loosely rendered, Gorky Park was formed by Stas Namin. The warming of relations with the West, and the era of mutual fraternizing allowed to create a Russian rock band that would sell in the USA. After a festival played together with Scorpions as headliners, Gorky Park signed a contract with Polygram records. With Bruce Fairbairn as producer, Gorky Park started recording their eponymized debut album. The concept of the album was to win the hearts of the American audience with reverential bows to the Russian cultural roots while still playing hard rock/heavy metal. "Bang!" written by Noskov and the album as a whole went on to win some high-ranking places on the radio and MTV, and in Denmark it even acquired gold status. Gorky Park – Noskov included – toured in the USA, were interviewed and otherwise enjoyed the limelight.

But financial difficulties, tensions inside the band, overstrained vocal cords, incessant sleepless nights, and pregnant wife at home soon added up to the aggregate outcome of Noskov leaving the band for Moscow home in 1990. Alexander Minkov would assume the lead vocalist role, while still playing bass.

Solo career
In 1994 Nikolai Noskov was at crossroads. Starting a solo career from level ground again was a deliberated decision. Noskov gradually underwent some major changes of inner vision. Throughout his solo career his hard rock likings slowly but steadily transformed into deeper music closer to ethnic ballad art rock; and though in his most recent albums hard rhythms are discernible, they may be more precisely characterized as funk. English was dropped after the first solo album Mother Russia, and Noskov started singing in Russian for Russian audience with no "foreign bloke" pretences.

... on my anniversary it was I who gathered Gorky Park for a reunion – Marshal excluded though ... And when I started singing "Bang!" I suddenly felt so far aloof from this song ... I felt that it did not stir my heart at all. I finished singing and asked myself: what was that for? Something from my past life, unbidden, some foreign language words ...

In 1998 he released his debut solo album Я тебя люблю (another title Блажь). In 2002, he established a foundation for the support of ethnic music Wild Honey.

In 2006, he released his fourth album По пояс в небе. Some songs from this album are eastern musical motives performed on the Bashkir reed flute Quray.

In 2011 he sang Magomaev's song Мелодия on television music show Property of the Republic and won the competition.
In 2012 he recorded the album Без названия in Germany in the studio of producer Horst Schnebel. During the same year he sang in the 25th anniversary concert of Gorky Park.
In 2015 he was member of the jury in second season of reality TV series Glavnaya Stsena

Now he is recording his seventh studio album, which is to be released in 2019; songs from the upcoming album are Нет ни годы, Оно того стоит, Седые дети and upcoming duet with singer IVAN

In 2022, Noskov supported the Russian invasion of Ukraine.

Personal life 
Nikolai is married to his girlfriend, Marina since 1978. He has a daughter Katerina (born 1991) and a granddaughter Miroslava (born November 2015), granddaughter Valeria (born 26 December 2017)

In 2017, Nikolai was hospitalized with a thrombus in the cervical section, because of illness he suffered concerts.

Discography

In bands and ensembles
Ensemble Moscow (Москва)
 НЛО (UFO, 1982)

Band Grand Prix (Гран-при)
 К теологии (EP) (1988)

Band Gorky Park 
 Gorky Park (1989)

Band Nikolai (Николай) 
 Mother Russia (1994)

Solo albums 
 Я тебя люблю (I Love You, 1998) (another title Блажь, Whim)
 Стёкла и бетон (Glass and Concrete, 1999) (another title Паранойя, Paranoia)
 Дышу тишиной (Breathing the Silence, 2000)
 По пояс в небе (Waist-deep in the Sky, 2006)
 Оно того стоит (It's worth it, 2011, unreleased).
 Без названия (Untitled, 2012) (another title Мёд, Honey)
 Живой (Alive, 2019)

Compilations 
 Лучшие песни в сопровождении симфонического оркестра (Best songs accompanied by a symphony orchestra, 2001) 
 Лучшие песни (The Best Songs, 2002)
 Океан любви (Ocean of Love, 2003)
 Лучшие песни (The Best Songs, 2008)
 Дышу тишиной (DVD, Breathing the Silence)
 The Best (2016)

Singles 
 Ночь (Night, 1984, re-released in 2012)
 Живой (2019)

Awards 
 1992 - Profi
 1996-2015 - Golden Gramophone
1996 for «Я не модный»
1998 for «Я тебя люблю»
1999 for «Паранойя» 
2000 for «Это здорово»
2015 for «Это здорово» and 20th anniversary award 
 1998 - Ревнители русской словесности society of Pushkin
 1999 - Ministry of Interior Medal "For Service in the Caucasus"
 1999 - Medal of the Ministry of Defense for Strengthening Military Cooperation
 2000 - Ovation (Stylish soloist of the year)
 2004 — Medal «For Assistance to the Ministry of Interior of Russia»
 2006 — Medal «For the noble deeds for the glory of the fatherland»
 2009 - FSB Awards in the category Music art for song Павшим друзьям. The singer worked with the Symphony Orchestra of the Russian FSB.
 2018 - Meritorious Artist of the Russian Federation

References

External links

 Official site 
 MusLib
 Station.ru
 YouTube
 Facebook

1956 births
Living people
People from Gagarinsky District, Smolensk Oblast
Russian rock singers
Soviet male singers
20th-century Russian male singers
20th-century Russian singers
Gorky Park (band)
Russian folk-pop singers
Symphonic rock musicians
Russian multi-instrumentalists
Soul musicians
Art rock musicians
Synth-pop musicians
Progressive rock musicians
Baritones
Romani singers
New wave musicians
Funk musicians
Soul singers
Rhythm and blues singers
English-language singers from Russia
Psychedelic rock musicians
Alternative rock musicians
Folk rock musicians
Russian folk singers
Trip hop musicians
Honored Artists of the Russian Federation
Winners of the Golden Gramophone Award